Christophor Avvakumyan Vermishyan(ts) ( January 1863 in Tiflis – 1932) was an Armenian politician who served as Minister of Social Protection of the First Republic of Armenia from 1918 to 1919 and as Minister of Provisions of the First Republic of Armenia in 1919.

References 

People of the First Republic of Armenia
1863 births
1932 deaths
Politicians from Baku
People from Baku Governorate
Armenian mayors of Tbilisi
Ministers of Social Protection of the First Republic of Armenia